A crore (abbreviated cr) denotes ten million (10,000,000 or 107 in scientific notation) and is equal to 100 lakh in the Indian numbering system.  It is written as 1,00,00,000 with the local 2,2,3 style of digit group separators (one lakh is equal to one hundred thousand, and is written as 1,00,000).

It is widely used both in official and other contexts in Afghanistan, Bangladesh, Bhutan, India, Myanmar, Nepal, Pakistan, and Sri Lanka. It is often used in Bangladeshi, Indian, Pakistani, and Sri Lankan English.

Money
Large amounts of money in Bangladesh, India, Nepal, and Pakistan are often written in terms of crore or Koti. For example (one hundred and fifty million) is written as "fifteen crore rupees", "15 crore" or "". In the abbreviated form, usage such as "15 cr" (for "15 crore rupees") is common.

Trillions (in the short scale) of money are often written or spoken of in terms of lakh crore. For example, one trillion rupees is equivalent to:

 One lakh crore rupees
 1 lakh crore
 105+7
 1012
 10,00,00,00,00,000 in Indian notation
 1,000,000,000,000 in metric notation

The word crore derives from the Prakrit word kroḍi, which in turn comes from the Sanskrit koṭi (कोटि), denoting ten million in the Indian numbering system, which has separate terms for most powers of ten from 100 up to 1019. The crore is known by various regional names.

See also

 Bollywood 100 Crore Club
 English numerals
 Hebdo-
 Kaun Banega Crorepati
 Lakh
 Myriad (10,000)
 Names of large numbers
 Nepalese rupee

References

Sources
 
 

Customary units in India
Hindi words and phrases
Powers of ten
Units of amount
Urdu-language words and phrases